Federated States of Micronesia Department of Education (FSM NDOE or FSMED) is the national education department of the Federated States of Micronesia. It is headquartered in Palikir, Pohnpei, Pohnpei State.

See also
 Education in the Federated States of Micronesia

References

External links
 Federated States of Micronesia Department of Education
 
Education in the Federated States of Micronesia
Government of the Federated States of Micronesia
Education ministries